Van Gool is a Dutch toponymic surname, meaning "from Goirle". "Gool" is a phonetic approximation of the regional pronunciation of Goirle. Notable people with the surname include:

Andre Van Gool, Dutch-born Belgian illustrator
Jacob van Gool (1596–1667), Dutch Orientalist and mathematician better known by his Latinized name Jacobus Golius
Jan van Gool (1685–1763), Dutch painter and art historian
Jean Van Gool (1931–1986), French footballer
Jef Van Gool (born 1935), Belgian footballer
Luc Van Gool, computer science professor
Roger Van Gool (born 1950), Belgian footballer
Wilma van Gool-van den Berg (born 1947), Dutch sprinter

References

Dutch-language surnames
Goirle
Surnames of Dutch origin
Toponymic surnames